Dragoon Wells Massacre is a 1957 American CinemaScope DeLuxe Color Western film directed by Harold D. Schuster starring Barry Sullivan, Dennis O'Keefe, Mona Freeman and Katy Jurado. The supporting cast features Sebastian Cabot, Jack Elam and Hank Worden.

Plot
Wagons converge in the middle of nowhere. One is carrying Army captain Matt Riordan, the only survivor of an ambush by Chief Yellow Claw and his Apache braves. Another is a prison wagon carrying accused killer Link Ferris and a second man, known as Tioga, to town for trial, escorted by Marshal Bill Haney.

A stagecoach turns up next, owned by Jonah McAdam and carrying Matt's former sweetheart, Ann Bradley, with her new beau, wealthy Philip Scott, as well as Mara Fay, an entertainer. The passengers are warned that Yellow Claw is in the area. Link and Tioga have their shackles removed so they can assist the others when the Apaches attack.

Matt discovers that McAdam is smuggling weapons to the Indians illegally. At a relay station, a young girl is the only one left after the Apaches have burned it to the ground. Ann looks after her while Tioga sacrifices his life to save the child. Matt falls in love with Mara and joins forces with Link to defeat the raiders. For his help, Link is granted his freedom by Haney. As he rides away, Link is followed by Ann.

Cast
 Barry Sullivan as Link Ferris
 Dennis O'Keefe as Capt. Matt Riordan
 Mona Freeman as Ann Bradley
 Katy Jurado as Mara Fay
 Sebastian Cabot as Jonah
 Casey Adams as Phillip Scott
 Jack Elam as Tioga
 Trevor Bardette as Marshal Bill Haney
 Jon Shepodd as Tom
 Hank Worden as Hopi Charlie
 Warren Douglas as Jud
 Judy Strangis as Susan
 Alma Beltran as Station agent's wife
 John War Eagle as Yellow Claw

Production
Parts of the film were shot in Kanab Canyon, Johnson Canyon, the Gap, and the Kanab movie fort in Utah.

Reception 
Time Out called it "a highly enjoyable film, magnificently shot by William Clothier and with a surprisingly tight, inventive script by Warren Douglas ".

Comic book adaptation
 Dell Four Color #815 (July 1957)

See also
 First Battle of Dragoon Springs
 List of American films of 1957

References

External links
 
 
 

1957 films
1957 Western (genre) films
American Western (genre) films
Apache Wars films
Films shot in Utah
1950s English-language films
Films directed by Harold D. Schuster
Films produced by Lindsley Parsons
Films with screenplays by Warren Douglas
Films scored by Paul Dunlap
Allied Artists films
Films adapted into comics
1950s American films